Malistan or Malestan is a town and the district center of Malistan District, Ghazni Province, Afghanistan. Once the town was a bazaar.

See also
 Malistan district
 Ghazni Province

References

Populated places in Ghazni Province